Josh Kann (born 15 November 1999) is an Australian cricketer. He made his Twenty20 debut on 11 December 2021, for the Hobart Hurricanes in the 2021–22 Big Bash League season.

References

External links
 

1999 births
Living people
Australian cricketers
Hobart Hurricanes cricketers
Place of birth missing (living people)